It's What I Do is the fifth studio album by American country music artist Billy Dean. It was his first album since Men'll Be Boys two years previous. This was also his first release for Capitol Records Nashville, as the Nashville division of Liberty Records had been merged into Capitol. The album produced three singles: the title track at #5, followed by "That Girl's Been Spyin' on Me" at #4 and "I Wouldn't Be a Man" at #45. (The latter was originally a Top Ten country hit for Don Williams, in 1987.) The album also reunited him with Tom Shapiro, who had co-produced his first two albums.

Track listing

Personnel

Eddie Bayers – drums, percussion
Bruce Bouton – lap steel guitar
Larry Byrom – acoustic guitar
Linda Davis – background vocals
Billy Dean – lead vocals, background vocals, acoustic guitar
Thom Flora – background vocals
Paul Franklin – pedal steel guitar, Dobro
Terry McMillan – shaker, tambourine, cowbell, harmonica
Steve Nathan – keyboards
Brent Rowan – acoustic guitar, electric guitar
Joe Spivey – fiddle, mandolin
Nicol Sponberg- background vocals
Tina Clark-Vallejo – background vocals
Biff Watson – acoustic guitar
Glenn Worf – bass guitar
Curtis Wright – background vocals
Curtis Young – background vocals
Jonathan Yudkin – fiddle

Synthesizer strings performed by Carl Marsh, arranged by Carl Marsh and Tom Shapiro.

Chart performance

References
Allmusic (see infobox)

1996 albums
Capitol Records albums
Billy Dean albums